Tokyo File 212 is a 1951 spy film directed by  and . George Breakston wrote the film's script and co-produced it with Dorrell McGowan jointly under the banner of their newly formed Breakston–McGowan Productions and Japanese . Californian lawyer Melvin Belli executive-produced the feature while composer Albert Glasser provided the film's score.

The film, a Japanese-American co-production, starred Florence Marly and Robert Peyton in the lead roles while Tetsu Nakamura played the antagonist. Katsuhiko Haida, Reiko Otani, Tatsuo Saitō and Heihachirô Ôkawa featured as supporting characters. Real life geisha Ichimaru appeared in a song sequence. The plot revolved around an American Intelligence agent (Peyton) sent to Japan to track down a suspected communist who was previously his college-mate (Haida).

Principal photography commenced on July 21, 1950 in Japan and was completed in 36 days; making it Hollywood's first feature film to be shot entirely in Japan. RKO Pictures distributed the film in the US. Upon release the film received mixed reviews from critics who found the story unconvincing, though they appreciated the scenic settings. It turned out to be a commercial failure too.

Plot 
The film begins with the scene of a bomb explosion. The story then cuts back to a few days earlier. U.S. intelligence agent Jim Carter is sent to Japan as a National Weekly Indicator journalist to find Taro Matsudo who is helping the Communists there. Matsudo happens to be Carter's college friend. In his hotel, Carter meets Steffi Novak, a mysterious woman who speaks six languages and wishes to accompany him. Together they are taken to a bar by Joe, an undercover agent posing as a taxi driver. Carter tries to approach Taro but he does not want to meet Jim. Back at his hotel, Jim receives a telegram informing him to reach Enoshima island. Here he meets Taro who refuses to divulge any information about his commander. He meets Taro's father Matsudo, a government official, who tells him that Matsudo aspired to be a kamikaze pilot but when Japan surrendered during World War II, he was disappointed with the government and sided with the Communists. When Jim returns to his hotel room, he is beaten by a group of Japanese men who tell him to stay away from Taro.

Meanwhile, Steffi meets Oyama who promises her that in return for spying on Carter she would be able to meet her sister in North Korea. Unknown to Steffi her sister is dead. She takes Cater to meet Oyama at an enkai party at a resort in Atami. Somehow, Carter learns that the food offered to him is poisoned. He is forced to eat it and heads back to the hotel and unexpectedly survives. Next, he goes to Tokyo's Takarazuka Theater where he meets Taro's lover Namiko. Here he gains a lot of information about Taro. After he leaves, Namiko is kidnapped and thrown from a moving car; she is hospitalized soon after. Once Taro learns of the incident, he rushes to meet her but refuses to believe that his organization had any involvement with the accident. After having gained evidences of Steffi spying on him, Carter arrests her. When she tells him that she was doing this to meet her sister, Carter informs her that her sister was murdered at Oyama's orders. Steffi vows revenge against Oyama and resolves to help Carter.

Oyama intends to provoke a railroad strike in order to halt the war efforts. Matsudo and Taro face each other at the railway tracks, where both of them give speeches to the workers. In a short period the gathering turns into a brawl and several people, including Matsudo are badly injured. The Tokyo Metropolitan Police Department intervenes to restore peace. Taro decides to meet Namiko at the hospital but finds her dead. Oyama's henchmen take him to his office and when Taro learns of Oyama's plan to kill Carter, Steffi and Matsudo by a time bomb explosion, he jumps out of the window to draw them away from the bench under which the bomb is placed. Carter reaches Oyama's place with his associates and the police. Seeing no option left, Oyama confesses his crimes, angering his right-hand man who stabs him for disloyalty towards their organization; the man is shot and Oyama dies. After completing his mission Carter returns to the United States, with Steffi and Matsudo seeing him off.

Cast 

Florence Marly as Steffi Novak; an informer working for the communist later but changes side after learning about her sister's death at the hands of communists. Marly declared that Tokyo File 212 was her best film since coming to the United States.
Lee Frederick (Robert Peyton) as Jim Carter; an undercover US agent sent to Japan to thwart a communist ring's purpose
Katsuhiko Haida as Taro Matsuto; a former kamikaze pilot who defected with the communists after Japan surrendered in World War II
Reiko Otani as Namiko; Taro's girlfriend who is killed by the communists. Her death turns Taro against his allies.
Tatsuo Saitō as Mr. Matsuto; Taros's father, a politician.
Tetsu Nakamura as Mr. Oyama; leader of a Communist ring in Japan and the boss of Taro.
Suisei Matsui as Joe; an undercover agent posing as a taxi driver
Maj. Richard W.N. Childs, U.S. Army Reserve as himself 
Lt. Richard Finiels GHQ, U.S. Army Far East Command as himself
Cpl. Stuart Zimmerley, Military Police, U.S. Army as himself
Pvt. James Lyons Military Police, U.S. Army as himself
Byron Michie as Mr. Jeffrey
Ichimaru as herself (Geisha Singer)

In addition to the above, Heihachirô Ôkawa, Jun Tazaki and Dekao Yokoo also played minor roles. The Takarazuka Revue performed the Imperial Theater sequence.

Production

Development and casting 
George Paul Breakston, who had appeared in It Happened One Night (1934) and The Grapes of Wrath (1940) as a child actor, worked in the Signal Corps during World War II and also visited Tokyo. After the war ended, Breakston shifted his focus towards films, directing Urubu: The Story of Vulture People (1948) and Jungle Stampede (1950). During this time, he drafted Tokyo File 212 and met Hollywood studio executives and producers with the script. Dorrell and Stewart McGowan, in addition to writing the film's screenplay, agreed to back the production and established the company Breakston–McGowan Productions, Inc. for this venture. Lawyer Melvin Belli invested $10,000 in the project and was credited as executive producer. Irene Breakston and C. Ray Stahl were the assistant and associate producer respectively. Herman Schopp handled the cinematography while Albert Glasser provided the musical score. The production company joined hands with Japanese 's . The latter agreed to provide half of the budget and Japanese actors and crew members in return for half of the film's earnings in both Japan and the United States.

Tokyo File 212 was approved by Douglas MacArthur in May 1950 with Lloyd Nolan as the male lead though eventually Robert Peyton was finalized, marking his first appearance in a leading role. Contemporary newspaper reports indicated that Leif Erickson and Sessue Hayakawa were also considered for the protagonist and antagonist's roles respectively. The former left 20th-Fox's Half Angel (1951) in hopes of gaining this project. Florence Marly, due to star in a big-budget Mexican feature and under contract with Allied Artists at that time, was borrowed for the film. The cast also included Tatsuo Saitō, Suisei Matsui, Tetsu Nakamura, Katsuhiko Haida and Reiko Otani, who was cast after an audition. It was the only film approved by MacArthur for filming in Japan and he provided the filmmakers with intelligence files to facilitate their research for the film. He also provided interpreters and several intelligence officers appeared in the film. Real military generals and detectives were cast for the respective roles. Tokyo File 212 was the film debut of geisha Ichimaru. Katsuhiko was initially uncomfortable with his kiss scene with Marley. Marley said of Katsuhiko that "[He] could give the Clark Gables and Tyrone Powers a run for their money." Incidentally, she happened to be the first American actress to visit Japan in 15 years. 40 Kamikaze pilots were also included in the cast.

Filming 

American actors and crew members reached Japan on July 21, 1950. Principal photography began on the same day under the working title of Danger City. The film was completed in 36 days and its final version was prepared in 2 months. Tokyo File 212 was Hollywood's first feature film to be shot entirely in Japan. Most of the film was shot in Tokyo, and some key scenes were shot in Atami and Enoshima. A communist group wished to appeal to Marly, who was born in Czechoslovakia, not to act in the film. She was told about it only after the crew had returned to the US after completing the principal photography. At the Ohuzumi studio in Tokyo, 26 sets were constructed for the film's shooting. For the final bomb explosion scene, the Japanese used 15 black-powdered bombs instead of the pre-planned six. The blast caused Dorrel McGowan to fall on his back and alarmed the city's air patrol and the military police, fire wagons along with riot squads rushed to the shooting location. They were unaware that the explosion was done for a film. A few crew member including Marly were hurt in the explosion. The scene where Taro leaps from a window was shot by two cameramen and he was pushed from the window with one cameraman recording just above the window. For a street celebration scene shot in Enoshima, the Japanese extras drank a lot of sake to make the scene authentic. The rail strike scene took inspiration from a similar strike that occurred in 1949. 8 trains and 200 engineers were provided for the same scene. During this particular scene several actors were injured. The communists did not want its filming to occur and their threats made the Japanese cast and crew members unwilling to work unless more security was provided.

The production team had access to places where only military cars and trucks were allowed. Location shooting in Japan helped reduce the production costs significantly and the film was completed with a budget of approximately US$700,000 with Dorrel McGowan later stating it would have cost millions of dollars if the film was shot in the US. During her visit, Marly also entertained American soldiers stationed there. She gave instructions in kissing to five Japanese actors, including Toru Abe and Teiji Takahashi, at Meguro Gajoen hotel during a press conference. This incident did not go down well with some sections of the Japanese who loathed Abe for being kissed by a foreigner and even accused him of bringing shame to the nation. After returning from Japan, Dorell McGowan declared that the Japanese were the greatest actors in the world. He also praised the set building techniques employed by the Japanese. One scene was shot at Tokyo's Imperial Theater.

Release 
Due to the film's content RKO executives were eager to release Tokyo File 212 soon. The Japanese and US premieres were scheduled for December 15, 1950 and May 2, 1951 respectively. Gen. Douglas MacArthur and the Japanese emperor Hirohito were invited to attend the former event at Tokyo's Ernie Pyle theatre. However it opened in Japan on January 24, 1951 and released in the United States on May 5. Geisha girls were brought from Japan to perform at the film's opening in major US cities including Washington, D.C. The Catholic organisation National Legion of Decency considered the film morally objectionable in part and gave it a B rating.

The New York daily Plattsburgh Press-Republican predicted that the film would be an outright purchase. Prominent films it was double billed with included Sealed Cargo and Cyclone Fury (both 1951). It premiered on television on May 13, 1959. The fact that it was filmed in Japan was well publicized. In Japan, Toyoko and Toei managed the film's promotion.

Soundtrack 

Albert Glasser provided the music score. 

In addition to the above titles "Oyedo Boogie" by Yasuo Shimizu & Shizuo Yoshikawa was also included. The soundtrack's LP record was released in 1987 under the label of Screen Archives Entertainment.

Reception 

Reviewers criticized the film's plot but praised the scenic settings. Reviewer from Monthly Film Bulletin found the Japanese settings "interesting", but called the story confusing and felt that the depiction of communist activities was childishly silly. Brog in Variety opined that Marly had fulfilled her role and Peyton's acting was okay. He praised the "Oyedo Boogie" song sequence and the Japanese background. He stated that despite having good "exploitation values", the story had turned out be at "pulp fiction level". The Christian Science Monitor reviewer was of the view that the work was "more or less routine entertainment" but praised Marly's "expert job" and the Japanese settings. However, he felt that the dialogues in Japanese language were a little confusing and Peyton's performance was not worth arousing sympathy for its "professional detachment" and "unemotional determination". The Washington Post critic Richard L. Coe termed the film a "low-level, pulp magazine job" and a "less worthy buck-catcher" but felt that it had advantage of realistic settings. He also criticized the approval note before the film and advised the government departments to be more careful while approving them. A. H. Weiler of The New York Times questioned why "the long trip" to Japan was made for the "awkward melodrama". He called the story "comic-strip level" fiction, Peyton's performance "[stony]", criticized the "muscular and uninspired" acting and dialogues. He concluded his review by stating that the film was "one "file" that should never have been plucked from the archives." John L. Scott wrote in Los Angeles Times that the "production moves slowly and abrupt cutting doesn't help the matter much" and termed the picture a "routine spy business".

For Eiga no tomo editor Nagaharu Yodogawa who called it a "failure", viewing the feature was a "truly painful" experience. Critic Kodama Kazuo noted in his book that the film's "reputation [was] terribly bad" in Japan. Tasmanian daily Examiner called the film an "explosive melodrama". The Newcastle Sun called it a "rather unusual film", its background atmosphere "excellent" and praised Marly's performance. However, the reviewer felt that her character was "made-up a little too heavily". James King wrote in his book Under Foreign Eyes that Korea and Communist menace was underscored and the Japanese characters were portrayed as having conflicting emotions with the Western ones. He further said that the film created a notion that Japanese had to be rescued from themselves and Oyama represents the Japanese who think of foreigners as enemies. Jeanette Roan felt that the storyline was "well suited to the ideological goals of the reconstruction" but location shooting was unnecessary. In his book Korean War Filmography, Robert J. Lentz stated that Marly had given the film's "best performance" and made the feature worth watching. He was surprised that a few more shots of "scenic Tokyo" had not been included and called the Communist bar scene "unintentionally comic". Lentz was critical of the script, likened Peyton's voice to that of a TV series actor and rated the film, best of the three produced by Breakston. 42–58% turnout was reported during the first week of the film's screening in Tokyo and it was declared a commercial failure. In 2004, it was released on DVD by Alpha Video.

References

Bibliography

Further reading 
 Tokyo File 212 Production File, Margaret Herrick Library, Academy of Motion Picture Arts and Sciences, Beverly Hills, California
 Tokyo File 212 Folder, Box 696, Office of Public Information Records, Record Group 330, National Archives, College Park, Maryland
 Tokyo File 212 Folder, Box 5291, Records of the Supreme Commander for the Allied Powers, Record Group 331, National Archives, College Park, Maryland

External links 

American spy films
Japanese spy films
1950s spy films
American black-and-white films
Korean War films
Films set in Tokyo
Films set in Japan
Films set in Fujisawa, Kanagawa
American anti-communist propaganda films
Films critical of communism
Communism in fiction
Cold War spy films
Films directed by George Breakston
Films scored by Albert Glasser
Films shot in Tokyo
RKO Pictures films
Japan in non-Japanese culture
1950s English-language films
1950s American films